The Reform Party of Syria ( Ḥizb Al-Iṣlāḥ Al-Sūrīy), or RPS is a secular Syrian political party and lobby group based in the United States that was active in the mid to late 2000s. Its leader, Farid Ghadry, is a United States citizen and has been described as "controversial" by Al Jazeera. According to the RPS, they were formed as a response to 9/11. It is a member of fellow lobbying organization the Coalition Against Terrorist Media.

An opposition party against the ruling Arab Socialist Ba'ath Party – Syria Region, the Reform Party of Syria advocates for a "New Syria" characterised by democratic and economic reform. The RPS claims that the main factors of increased terrorism are "political despotism, economic deprivation, and social stagnation in the Middle East". The party supports globalization and free trade agreements between Syria and the rest of the Middle East, the banning of weapons of mass destruction, freedom of religion, and peace between Syria and the countries of Israel, Lebanon, Turkey, Jordan and Iraq.

WikiLeaks cables released revealed that Ghadry and his organization were viewed as "unwelcome" by Riad Seif, and a Syrian member of parliament described Ghadry as not being a "major figure", and was perplexed by U.S. backing of him. Similarly Haitham al-Maleh, who would later become a senior figure in the Syrian National Council, viewed Ghadry as an "opportunist".

See also
Iran Syria Policy and Operations Group
Foundation for Democracy in Iran

References

External links
Reform Party of Syria

Politics of Syria
Political parties in Syria
Secularism in Syria